The Great Buddha (French - Le Grand Buddha) is an 1899 oil on canvas painting by Paul Gauguin, now in the Pushkin Museum in Moscow.

The artist produced the work during his second trip to Polynesia. Georges Wildenstein, compiler of a catalogue raisonné of Gauguin's work, states that since the artist's signature is difficult to distinguish the work could also have been 1896 or 1898, though he himself dated it to 1899. Gauguin sent the finished work to Europe and his friend George-Daniel de Monfreid kept it in Paris.

References

Paintings by Paul Gauguin
1899 paintings
Paintings in the collection of the Pushkin Museum
Dogs in art